The UK Singles Chart is one of many music charts compiled by the Official Charts Company that calculates the best-selling singles of the week in the United Kingdom. Before 2004, the chart was only based on the sales of physical singles. This list shows singles that peaked in the Top 10 of the UK Singles Chart during 1966, as well as singles which peaked in 1965 and 1967 but were in the top 10 in 1966. The entry date is when the single appeared in the top 10 for the first time (week ending, as published by the Official Charts Company, which is six days after the chart is announced).

One-hundred and nineteen singles were in the top ten in 1966. Ten singles from 1965 remained in the top 10 for several weeks at the beginning of the year, while "Save Me" by Dave Dee, Dozy, Beaky, Mick & Tich, "Sunshine Superman" by Donovan and "What Becomes of the Brokenhearted" by Jimmy Ruffin were all released in 1966 but did not reach their peak until 1967. "Let's Hang On!" by The Four Seasons featuring Frankie Valli, and "My Ship Is Comin' In" by The Walker Brothers were the singles from 1965 to reach their peak in 1966. Twenty-eight artists scored multiple entries in the top 10 in 1966. Dave Dee, Dozy, Beaky, Mick & Tich, Four Tops, Ike & Tina Turner, Nancy Sinatra, Small Faces and The Spencer Davis Group were among the many artists who achieved their first UK charting top 10 single in 1966.

The 1965 Christmas number-one, "Day Tripper"/"We Can Work It Out" by The Beatles, remained at number one for the first three weeks of 1966. The first new number-one single of the year was "Keep On Running" by The Spencer Davis Group. Overall, twenty different singles peaked at number-one in 1966, with The Spencer Davis Group and The Beatles (2) having the joint most singles hit that position.

Background

Multiple entries
One-hundred and nineteen singles charted in the top 10 in 1966, with one-hundred and eight singles reaching their peak this year. "Elusive Butterfly" was recorded by Bob Lind and Val Doonican and both versions reached the top 10.

Twenty-eight artists scored multiple entries in the top 10 in 1966. The Beach Boys, Dave Dee, Dozy, Beaky, Mick & Tich, The Kinks and Small Faces shared the record for most top 10 hits in 1966 with four hit singles each.

The Walker Brothers were one of a number of artists with two top-ten entries, including the number-one single "The Sun Ain't Gonna Shine Anymore". Crispian St. Peters, Herman's Hermits, Petula Clark, The Supremes and Val Doonican were among the other artists who had multiple top 10 entries in 1966.

Chart debuts
Thirty artists achieved their first top 10 single in 1966, either as a lead or featured artist. Of these, three went on to record another hit single that year: Crispian St. Peters, Lee Dorsey and The Lovin' Spoonful. The Spencer Davis Group and The Troggs both had two more top 10 singles in 1966. Dave Dee, Dozy, Beaky, Mick & Tich and Small Faces each had three other entries in their breakthrough year.

The following table (collapsed on desktop site) does not include acts who had previously charted as part of a group and secured their first top 10 solo single.

Notes
Alan Price was the original keyboardist for The Animals, leaving in 1965 after the group had broken through with two top 10 hits, including number-one single "House of the Rising Sun". He went on to have a solo career and charted with his own band The Alan Price Set in 1966.

The Merseys were an offshoot of the group The Merseybeats, created by former members Tony Crane and Billy Kinsley. "Sorrow" was their only hit single as a duo before they folded in 1968.

Songs from films
Original songs from various films entered the top 10 throughout the year. These included "Alfie" (from Alfie), "Strangers in the Night" (A Man Could Get Killed) and "Yellow Submarine" (Yellow Submarine in 1968).

Additionally, the original version of "Love Letters" was nominated for the Academy Award for Best Original Song after being used in the film of the same name (losing out to "It Might As Well Be Spring" from State Fair). "The More I See You" was first sung by Dick Haymes in the 1945 film Diamond Horseshoe.

Best-selling singles
Until 1970 there was no universally recognised year-end best-sellers list. However in 2011 the Official Charts Company released a list of the best-selling single of each year in chart history from 1952 to date. According to the list, "Green, Green Grass of Home" by Tom Jones is officially recorded as the biggest-selling single of 1966. "Green, Green Grass of Home" (10) ranked in the top 10 best-selling singles of the decade.

Top-ten singles
Key

Entries by artist

The following table shows artists who achieved two or more top 10 entries in 1966, including singles that reached their peak in 1965 or 1967. The figures include both main artists and featured artists. The total number of weeks an artist spent in the top ten in 1966 is also shown.

See also
1966 in British music
List of number-one singles from the 1960s (UK)

Notes

 "Save Me" reached its peak of number three on 4 January 1967 (week ending).
 "What Becomes of the Brokenhearted" reached its peak of number eight on 4 January 1967 (week ending).
 "Make the World Go Away" re-entered the top 10 at number 10 on 23 March 1966 (week ending) for 5 weeks.
 "Summer in the City" re-entered the top 10 at number 10 on 7 September 1966 (week ending).
 "Distant Drums" was Jim Reeves' only number-one, topping the chart two years after his death.
 "My Mind's Eye" re-entered the top 10 at number 10 on 11 January 1967 (week ending).
 "What Becomes of the Brokenhearted" re-entered the top 10 at number 8 on 4 January 1967 (week ending).
 Figure includes single that peaked in 1967.
 Figure includes single that peaked in 1965.
 Figure includes appearance on "Little Man" by Sonny & Cher.
 Figure includes single that first charted in 1965 but peaked in 1966.

References
General

Specific

External links
1966 singles chart archive at the Official Charts Company (click on relevant week)

Top 10 singles
United Kingdom
1966